A green home is a type of house designed to be environmentally sustainable. Green homes focus on the efficient use of "energy, water, and building materials". A green home may use sustainably sourced, environmentally friendly, and/or recycled building materials. It may include sustainable energy sources such as solar or geothermal, and be sited to take maximum advantage of natural features such as sunlight and tree cover to improve energy efficiency.

Elements
No government standards define what constitutes a green remodel, beyond non-profit certification. In general, a green home is a house that is built or remodeled in order to conserve "energy or water; improve indoor air quality; use sustainable, recycled or used materials; and produce less waste in the process." This may include buying more energy-efficient appliances or employing building materials that are more efficient in managing temperature.

History

United States 
In the United States, the green building movement began in the 1970s, after the price of oil began to increase sharply. In response, researchers began to look into more energy efficient systems. 
Nevertheless, individuals required persistence to navigate the bewildering array of incomplete and imperfect information that was the wilderness frontier of what is now known as green building. In 1999, Richard and Katherine Homan began building Dallas, Texas' first comprehensive green home.

It took until 2012 for the city to issue a proclamation for having the city’s first comprehensive green home.

Many organizations were founded in the 1990s to promote green buildings. Some organizations worked to improve consumer knowledge so that they could have more green homes. The International Code Council and the National Association of Home Builders began working in 2006 to create a "voluntary green home building standard".

The Energy Policy Act was enacted in 2005, which allowed tax reductions for homeowners who could show the use of energy efficient changes to their homes, such as solar panels and other solar-powered devices.

Certifications
Various types of certifications certify a home as a green home. The U.S. Green Building Council is an example of an organization that gives out green home certifications. Its certification is titled as Leadership in Energy and Environmental Design. The factors that it considers include "the site location, use of energy and water, incorporation of healthier building and insulation materials, recycling, use of renewable energy, and protection of natural resources".

The US National Association of Home Builders independently created its Model Green Home Building Guidelines as a type of certification, along with programs for utilities.

The Indian Green Building Council (IGBC), part of the Confederation of Indian Industry was formed in the year 2001. The council offers a wide array of services that include developing new green building rating programmes, certification services and green building training programmes.

References

Home
Sustainable building
Low-energy building